Thurlaston is a village and civil parish in the Rugby district of Warwickshire, England. According to the 2001 census the parish had a population of 352, increasing to 368 at the 2011 census, and again to 379 at the 2021 census.

Overview  
Thurlaston was mentioned in the Domesday Book as Torlavestone. Immediately to the north of the village is the M45 motorway. There is only one dead end road into Thurlaston from the north, connecting the village with the B4429, via a bridge over the M45 motorway. Thurlaston overlooks the Draycote Water reservoir to the south, and is close to the county border with Northamptonshire, less than 2 miles to the east.

Notable buildings
The village church of St. Edmund is a red brick building dating from 1849 designed by William Butterfield. It is unusual in that it was designed to serve as both a church and a school with a schoolmaster's house attached, it is now grade II listed. The most famous building, however, is probably the old 18th century windmill which is now used as a private house, this is also grade II listed.

References

External links

Thurlaston Parish Council website
Thurlaston - page on Our Warwickshire

Villages in Warwickshire